Steve Matthews may refer to:

 Steve Matthews (American football) (born 1970), former American football quarterback
 Steve A. Matthews (born 1955), American lawyer
 Steve Matthews (born 1979), birth name of American singer and bassist Argyle Goolsby
 Steve Matthews (rugby league), New Zealand rugby league player

See also
Matthews (disambiguation)